Freeport is a village in Digby County, Nova Scotia and it is located on Long Island in the Bay of Fundy.

At the end of Digby Neck on Long Island, Freeport is a working fishing village nestled around tidal basin. This area is great for bird watching, beach combing, hiking trails, birds, whale watching, gift shops, accommodations, restaurants, and unique flora and fauna.

History 
Loyalists founded Freeport in 1784 establishing fishing and trading industries. Prior to this it had been inhabited by the Mi'kmaq First Nation.

Place names such as Petit Passage, Grand Passage and the Saint Mary’s Bay can be attributed to the French explorer, Samuel de Champlain, who first visited the area in 1604. However, the village itself was most likely named for Freeport, Maine, or because the water of and surrounding the harbour does not freeze during winter due to extreme tidal fluctuations, making it free from ice. Well known Black Loyalist,  Rose Fortune is believed to have lived here in 1795, giving birth to one of her children.

Demographics 

In popular culture 
The community is the final destination of Brad Pitt in the movie World War Z (2013), although this scene was not filmed in Freeport, but Lulworth Cove in the UK.

References

Communities in Digby County, Nova Scotia
Villages in Nova Scotia
Designated places in Nova Scotia
1784 establishments in the British Empire